In Ayyavazhi mythology, the Nadutheerpu is the Final Judgement from which Kroni, the primordial Manifestation of Evil was sentenced to hell. During this judgement, his unlawful activities of all the seven previous yugas are remained once again to him and was finally thrown into the hell.

After Lord vaikundar attained Vaikundam, he sent a false deity who could perform so many miracles for testing the people for their faith. Then Vaikundar was crowned as a King in coming dharma yuga and placed in the 'Thuthi Singasana' - the Lion-faced Throne by Narayana and all other devas to rule all the fourteen worlds under a Single-umbrella. Being seated in the thrown Vaikundar, ordered the Sea to destroy the evil-beings of the world and contemplated the white-beings to enter the world. Then Kroni was brought before Vaikundar and was charged for his iniquitous activities.

Ayyavazhi